David Tukiçi (born 1956, Shkodër, Albania) is an Albanian composer and singer. He also holds Italian citizenship.

At 13, he won the 1969 edition of the Festivali i Këngës në RTSH as a singer and then pursued composition training notably with Çesk Zadeja, who was himself a pupil of Dmitri Shostakovich. From 1982 to 1992, he was the director of Radio Televizioni Shqiptar's symphonic music.

At the École normale de musique – Alfred Cortot de Paris, he studied with Michel Merlet and Dominique Rouits. He is the author of many symphonic compositions, both instrumental and vocal. Many of his pieces have been recorded. Notable among these is Horcynus Orca, a double concerto for flute, cello and string orchestra, composed in 2001 at the Politeama Siracusa and recorded in 2003, under his direction, by the Symphonic Orchestra of Calabria, featuring soloists Sonia Formenti and Francesco Mariozzi.

David Tukiçi is the son of Ibrahim Tukiqi and brother of Genc Tukiçi.

Bibliography
"David Tukiçi", in Sax, Mule & Co, Jean-Pierre Thiollet, Paris, H & D, 2004 (pp.|183–184). 

1956 births
Living people
Italian composers
Italian male composers
Albanian composers
Albanian expatriates in Italy
People from Shkodër
École Normale de Musique de Paris alumni
Festivali i Këngës winners